The Mark of the Maker is a 1991 American short documentary film about manual papermaking, produced by David McGowan. It was nominated for an Academy Award for Best Documentary Short.

References

External links
The Mark of the Maker at Direct Cinema Limited

1991 films
1991 short films
1991 documentary films
1990s short documentary films
American independent films
American short documentary films
Papermaking
1991 independent films
1990s English-language films
1990s American films